Neal Roëll Viereck (born 3 May 2004) is a Dutch professional footballer who plays for Jong Ajax in the Eerste Divisie.

Early life
As a young player transitioning playing for Ajax under-13 and under-14’s Viereck suffered from a number of injuries linked to a growth spurt that saw his grow 4cm in a season.

Career

2022 senior debut
Viereck made his professional debut on 11 December 2022 against Jong Utrecht in the Eerste Divisie.

2023 - sent off after 30 seconds
Viereck received unfortunate worldwide press coverage when he was sent-off playing for Jong Ajax against De Graafschap on 13 January 2023 just 30 seconds after appearing as a substitute. He came onto the pitch in the 59th minute as a replacement for Jorrel Hato but was dismissed in the 60th minute for a professional foul on Camiel Neghli and he was shown an immediate red card by referee Luuk Timmer. The event was reported as unusual and of a comical nature worldwide including Ecuador, Portugal, Peru, 
Argentina, and Bosnia. It was only his second professional appearance. An appeal against the red card by the club was unsuccessful and Viereck’s red card was upheld and he served suspension.

References

External links

Living people
2004 births
Dutch footballers
Jong Ajax players
Eerste Divisie players
Association football defenders